The 2011–12 Rubin Kazan season was the 8th straight season that the club will play in the Russian Premier League, the highest tier of football in Russia.

Squad

Out on loan

Transfers

In

Loans in

Out

Loans out

Released

Friendlies

2012 Marbella Cup

Competitions

Russian Premier League

Matches

Table

Russian Premier League – Championship group

Results by round

Matches

League table

Russian Cup 2011–12

Final

Europa League

2010–11

Knockout phase

2011–12

Group stage

Knockout phase

UEFA Champions League

Qualifying round

Squad statistics

Appearances and goals

|-
|colspan="14"|Players away from the club on loan:
|-
|colspan="14"|Players who appeared for Rubin Kazan' no longer at the club:

|}

Goal scorers

Disciplinary record

Notes
Notes
Note 1: Played in Moscow at Luzhniki Stadium as there was severe cold in Kazan and Rubin Kazan's Central Stadium had a probable frozen pitch. Kickoff also moved to 13:00 CET (15:00 local time) due to cold weather.
Note 2: Played at the Luzhniki Stadium in Moscow due to the severe cold weather in Kazan, which meant the pitch at Rubin Kazan's Central Stadium would be frozen. Kickoff also moved to 12:00 CET (15:00 local time) due to cold weather.

References

FC Rubin Kazan seasons
Rubin Kazan
Rubin Kazan